Michel Djaozandry (born 17 February 1998) is a Canadian professional soccer player who plays as a full-back.

Early life
Djaozandry was born in Trois-Rivières, Quebec. At youth level, he played soccer for Trois-Rivières, L'Assomption and Sainte-Julie.

In 2016 and 2017, Djaozandry played for the academy of Major League Soccer club Montreal Impact, making 22 appearances in the USSDA and scoring one goal.

Club career
In 2013, Djaozandry played for CNHP (Centre National de Haute Performance) which is located in Laval, Montréal. He did so for two years (2015).

In 2017, Djaozandry played for Première Ligue de soccer du Québec side CS St-Hubert, making ten appearances. The following year, he made nine appearances for the club. He participated in the CPL Open Trials in fall 2018, but failed to make the final cut.

In 2019, Djaozandry made twelve appearances for St-Hubert and scored one goal. That year, he spent time on trial with USL Championship side Ottawa Fury and was invited to pre-season in 2020, but the club folded that off-season.

On 10 March 2020, Djaozandry signed his first professional contract with Canadian Premier League side Atlético Ottawa. On 30 August 2020, he made his professional debut as a substitute in a 2–0 loss to Forge FC, which would be his only appearance of the shortened 2020 season. On 26 February 2021, he was released by Ottawa.

In 2021, he played for St-Hubert's Reserve side in the PLSQ Reserve Division, but did not appear for the first team.

Personal life
Djaozandry is of Malagasy descent.

Career statistics

References

External links

1998 births
Living people
Association football fullbacks
Canadian soccer players
Soccer people from Quebec
Sportspeople from Trois-Rivières
Canadian people of Malagasy descent
CF Montréal players
Atlético Ottawa players
Première ligue de soccer du Québec players
Canadian Premier League players
CS St-Hubert players
FC L'Assomption players